The 2019 Quick Lane Bowl was a college football bowl game that was played on December 26, 2019, with kickoff at 8:00 p.m. EST on ESPN. It was the 6th edition of the Quick Lane Bowl, and was one of the 2019–20 bowl games concluding the 2019 FBS football season.

Teams

The game featured the Pittsburgh Panthers from the Atlantic Coast Conference (ACC) playing against the Eastern Michigan Eagles from the Mid-American Conference (MAC). It was the third meeting between Eastern Michigan and Pittsburgh; the Panthers had won both of their prior meetings.

Pittsburgh Panthers

Pittsburgh entered the bowl with a 7–5 record (4–4 in conference). The Panthers finished in three-way tie for third place in the Coastal Division of the ACC.

Eastern Michigan Eagles

Eastern Michigan entered the game at 6–6 (3–5 in conference). The Eagles finished tied with Toledo for fifth place in the West Division of the MAC.

Game summary

Statistics

References

External links

Game statistics at statbroadcast.com

Quick Lane Bowl
Quick Lane Bowl
Quick Lane Bowl
Quick Lane Bowl
Eastern Michigan Eagles football bowl games
Pittsburgh Panthers football bowl games